= North Sea Gas (group) =

Scottish folk music trio

- Origin: Edinburgh, United Kingdom
- Genres: Folk
- Years active: 1980–present
- Members: Dave Gilfillan, Grant Simpson, Ronnie MacDonald
- Past members: Colin McKenzie, Peter Farrell, Wally Allan, Colin Ramage, Gary McKenna, Bobby Miller, Kirsty McLean, Tim O'Leary, Cameron Gaskell
- Website: www.northseagas.co.uk

North Sea Gas are a Scottish folk music trio founded in 1980. The current lineup is Dave Gilfillan, Grant Simpson and Ronnie MacDonald. The music includes their own compositions, as well as arrangements of traditional Celtic and worldwide songs. Most songs are in English, with some in Scots or Gaelic.
